Georges-Alain Vuille (1948–99) was a Swiss film producer.

In the late 1970s he tried to finance a film version of the James Clavell novel Tai-Pan.

Filmography
Ashanti (1979) - producer
Womanlight (1979) - producer
The Favorite (1989) - producer

References

External links

Swiss film producers